La piel de Zapa is a Mexican telenovela produced by Televisa for Telesistema Mexicano in 1964.

Cast 
Elsa Cárdenas
Carlos Agostí
Elsa Cárdenas
Antonio de Hud

References

External links 

Mexican telenovelas
1964 telenovelas
Televisa telenovelas
1964 Mexican television series debuts
1964 Mexican television series endings
Spanish-language telenovelas